Aleksey Korneev (born 27 June 1998 in Moscow) is a Russian racing driver.

Career

Karting
Korneev began his professional karting career in 2013, competing all across Europe (predominantly in Germany).

Lower Formulae
In 2015, Korneev graduated to single-seaters in SMP F4. There he claimed two wins and finished fifth in the overall standings. He returned the following year for eight races. 

Korneev also competed in French F4, where he claimed a win and finished 11th in the overall standings.

Formula Renault 2.0
Whilst competing in SMP F4, Korneev appeared as guest driver in the final rounds of the Eurocup and Alps championships with JD Motorsport. 

In 2016, it was announced Korneev would compete in the sport full-time with JD. He finished 15th in the Eurocup standings and 19th in NEC standings.

Later that year, Korneev switched to Fortec for 2017. He had six point-scoring finishes, and ended season eighteenth, without improving.

Racing record

Career summary

† As Korneev was a guest driver, he was ineligible for points.

Complete Blancpain GT Series Sprint Cup results

References

External links
 

1998 births
Living people
Sportspeople from Moscow
Russian racing drivers
SMP F4 Championship drivers
French F4 Championship drivers
Formula Renault 2.0 Alps drivers
Formula Renault Eurocup drivers
Formula Renault 2.0 NEC drivers
Blancpain Endurance Series drivers
Koiranen GP drivers
Auto Sport Academy drivers
JD Motorsport drivers
SMP Racing drivers
Fortec Motorsport drivers